Arshad Iqbal Burki (born 15 March 1984 in Peshawar, Pakistan) is a professional squash player from Pakistan. Burki is Former Pakistan national squash champion and an Asian junior team gold medalist. His highest world ranking was #52 in January 2004.

www.burkisquashacademy.com

www.burkisquashacademy.com
 

1984 births
Living people
Pakistani male squash players
Pashtun people
Racket sportspeople from Peshawar
www.burkisquashacademy.com